The 2011 Central Oklahoma Bronchos football team represented the University of Central Oklahoma in the 2011 college football season, the 106th season of Broncho football. The team was led by fourth year head coach Tracy Holland. They played their home games at Wantland Stadium in Edmond, Oklahoma. The Bronchos were playing this season as an Independent because they were changing conference membership from the Lone Star Conference to the Mid-America Intercollegiate Athletics Association.

The season began play began with loss to North Alabama on the road on September 1, and ended with loss at home to Lindenwood on November 12. The Bronchos finished the season 2-9. After the season, the Bronchos fired head coach Tracy Holland.

Schedule

References

Central Oklahoma
Central Oklahoma Bronchos football seasons
Central Oklahoma Bronchos football